The Yehshan Building or Weird Building is a building in Longtan District, Taoyuan City, Taiwan.

History
The construction of the building started by the owner Yeh Fa-pao (葉發苞) who initially purchased a 330 m2 piece of land for a price of NT$3 million. After three decades, the building had nine floors. It was constructed in three stages, which were wood frames installation, reinforced concrete pouring and exterior decoration installations.

Architecture
The building was planned and designed by Yeh. It was constructed at a cost of NT$60 million.

References

Buildings and structures in Taoyuan City